Oyster is an international fashion, beauty, music and pop-culture title established in Australia in 1994 by Monica Nakata and Jonathan Morris.

The magazine features exclusive international fashion editorial, interviews, and extensive music and art editorial. Oyster showcases the work of leading photographers and young up-and-coming talent from around the world, and is renowned for its avant-garde approach to style.

From 1994–2012 Oyster was published bi-monthly. It was announced in 2015 that the frequency would change from bi-annual to quarterly print publication.

Oystermag.com
Oystermag.com was established in 2006 and offers extended content from the magazine, online fashion and beauty shoots, interviews and daily pop-culture news.

References

External links
oystermag.com - Oyster's official website

1994 establishments in Australia
Biannual magazines published in Australia
Bi-monthly magazines published in Australia
Fashion magazines
Lifestyle magazines published in Australia
Magazines established in 1994
Magazines published in Sydney
Quarterly magazines published in Australia